Anatoly Levin-Utkin was a Russian journalist and deputy editor of the weekly newspaper Yuridichesky Peterburg Segodnya ('Legal Petersburg Today'), a startup newspaper he helped launch.

Murder
He was killed on 21 August 1998 in an apparent robbery outside his home which is believed to be in connection to two investigative reports on Russian customs and secret services that he published a week earlier. On the day he was attacked, Levin-Utkin was working on a third report in his investigative series, containing allegations of corruption against Vladimir Putin, the newly appointed head of the FSB.

See also  

List of journalists killed in Russia

References 

Murdered Russian journalists
Russian male journalists
20th-century Russian journalists

Year of birth missing
1998 deaths